Nomar is a masculine given name and a surname. Notable people with the name include:

 Nomar Garciaparra (born 1973), American baseball player and sports analyst
 Nomar Angeles Isla (born 1970), Filipino basketball coach
 Nomar Mazara (born 1995), Dominican baseball player
 Ramón Nomar (born 1974), Venezuelan-born Spanish pornographic actor

See also
 Namor

Masculine given names